Kenneth Sanborn Pitzer (January 6, 1914 – December 26, 1997) was an American physical and theoretical chemist, educator, and university president. He was described as "one of the most influential physical chemists of his era" whose work "spanned almost all of the important fields of physical chemistry: thermodynamics, statistical mechanics, molecular structure, quantum mechanics, spectroscopy, chemical bonding, relativistic chemical effects, properties of concentrated aqueous salt solutions, kinetics, and conformational analysis."

Biography
Pitzer received his B.S. in 1935 from the California Institute of Technology and his Ph.D. from the University of California, Berkeley in 1937. Upon graduation, he was appointed to the faculty of UC Berkeley's Chemistry Department and was eventually elevated to professor. From 1951 to 1960, he served as dean of the College of Chemistry.

Pitzer was the third president of Rice University from 1961 until 1968 and sixth president of Stanford University from 1969 until 1971. His tenure at Stanford was turbulent due to student protests. Worn out by the confrontations, he announced his resignation in 1970 after a 19-month tenure.  He returned to UC Berkeley in 1971. He retired in 1984, but continued research until his death.

Pitzer was Director of Research for the U.S. Atomic Energy Commission from 1949 to 1951 and a member of the National Academy of Sciences. He was elected to the American Philosophical Society in 1954 and the American Academy of Arts and Sciences in 1958.

As a scientist, Pitzer was known for his work on the thermodynamic properties of molecules. While still a graduate student he discovered that hydrocarbon molecules do not rotate unhindered around their C-C bonds. There is in fact a barrier to internal rotation, an important discovery upsetting the conventional wisdom and affecting the thermodynamic properties of hydrocarbons. Some of his work is summed up in the Pitzer equations describing the behavior of ions dissolved in water. During his long career he won many awards, most notably the National Medal of Science and the Priestley Medal. The Ohio Supercomputing System named their new cluster Pitzer in honour of Kenneth Pitzer.

In the public hearing that led to the revocation of Robert Oppenheimer's security clearance, Pitzer testified about his policy differences with Oppenheimer concerning the development of thermonuclear weapons.

Personal life
Pitzer's father, Russell K. Pitzer, founded Pitzer College, one of the five Claremont Colleges in California. His son, Russell M. Pitzer is also a notable chemist who is currently retired from the faculty at Ohio State University.

See also
 Acentric factor
 Pitzer equations
 Pitzer strain

Books
 
 
  With acknowledgment to Gilbert Newton Lewis and Merle Randall, authors of the first edition, and to Leo Brewer, coauthor of the second edition.

References

External links
Guide to the Kenneth S. Pitzer Papers at The Bancroft Library

1914 births
1997 deaths
Presidents of Rice University
Presidents of Stanford University
Members of the United States National Academy of Sciences
American physical chemists
Theoretical chemists
University of California, Berkeley alumni
University of California, Berkeley faculty
National Medal of Science laureates
California Institute of Technology alumni
Fellows of the American Physical Society
20th-century American chemists
People from Pomona, California
Scientists from California
20th-century American academics
Members of the American Philosophical Society